Maria Manna,  (born as Maria Antonia Cocquio; February 26, 1961) is a Canadian singer, actress, and Ordained Minister. Maria was an esteemed judge for the 50th Canadian Juno Awards June 2021. She is known for her reign as "Klondike Kate" for the years 1999 and 2000. Manna was selected by the Edmonton Klondike Association to become Edmonton's Klondike Days Festival Ambassador and Headliner.

Life and career 
Manna was born in Edmonton, Alberta to immigrant parents Danilo Cocquio, born in Castiglione Olona, Italy in 1929 and Antonina Cantoro, born in Ortona Chieti, Italy, 1937. She attended Archbishop O'Leary High School where her main focus was music. She then received a diploma for hair stylist at the Northern Alberta Institute of Technology. After having 2 children, Manna attained a diploma in Police Sciences with Distinct Honors in 1995 from the International Correspondence School of Canada. In 2000, Manna was owner and operator of the Maria Manna Etiquette and Finishing School. Manna also owned and operated a spa, Maria Manna Life Spa in 2002.

Her 2000 album Klondike Kate in Bosnia featured her 10-city goodwill tour to Bosnia-Herzegovina with Canadian peacekeepers to entertain international troops as Edmonton legend Klondike Kate. The Canadian military sponsored her fundraising CD, and she later filled a military plane with clothing, medical and school supplies.

In 1999, Manna was diagnosed with a nodule on her vocal cords. After trying various alternative therapies, Manna chose to move forward with surgery, despite the 50% chance of permanent damage to her vocal cords. This surgery involved the removal of the nodule. The surgery was deemed successful, extending Manna's range from one octave to three octaves.

She has opened for The Beach Boys and performed with Paul Horn, Tommy Banks, Alfie Zappacosta and David Foster.

From April 2013 to April 2014, Manna undertook a donor relations coordinator position for the Victoria branch of Mercy Ships Canada, which operates charitable hospital ships that provide medicine and surgery to needy third world nations.

In addition to her music, Manna is a contributing author to a work of short stories: Earth Angels-Edition #1 (2018) with the short story "Bella Figura".

Manna was a host and producer on the musical competition Victoria Idol, in 2009, the proceeds of which were donated to PEERS (Prostitute Empowerment Education and Resource Society).

Manna's acting debut was in 2005 in The Engagement Ring, a made-for-TV movie which featured Lainie Kazan and Patricia Heaton.

In 2010 Manna produced Vancouver Island's Got Talent, a talent competition with proceeds funding the Maria Manna Bursary at the Victoria Conservatory of Music, a non-profit organization for children who cannot afford music lessons.

In 2016 Maria produced and starred in a talk show called "Maria Manna City Chat, a 5 segment show for SHAW Television discussing common topics with a new angle.

Manna is the co-founder and president of the Universal Jazz Advocates and Mentors Society, which is also known as U-JAMS.

Manna performs to raise funds for charity and has helped raise $750 million. Manna is an ordained minister.

Manna has volunteered with non-profit organizations The Vancouver Island South Film and Media Commission, Canadian Bar Association Benevolent Society, Greater Victoria Animal Crusaders Society, Royal Jubilee Hospital.

Other projects include the Maria Manna Bursary Fund, established at the Victoria Conservatory of Music to provide music lessons for talented children with socio-economic difficulties. Manna has performed at the Christmas Ladies of Jazz fundraiser for the Kidney Foundation of Canada at Hermann's Jazz Club with fellow musicians Maureen Washington and April Gislason.

Awards and honors
Manna received the Governor General's Sovereign's Medal for volunteers in 2016.

On January 24, 2013, Manna was awarded the Governor General's Caring Canadian Award at Government House for her charitable work.

Discography
 Solo Amore (1993)
 Klondike Kate in Bosnia (2000)
 Maria Manna (2006)
 With Love Maria Manna (2017)

References

External links
 
 

1961 births
Living people
Musicians from Edmonton
Canadian women jazz singers